Frieda Berryhill (1922 – 20 June 2012) was an American anti-nuclear and peace activist.

Berryhill was born in Waidhofen an der Ybbs, Austria, during the turbulent times after World War I and the economic crisis bringing right-wing movements to power in several countries in Europe.  After World War II, she met an  American officer, emigrated to the United States and settled in North Carolina where they were married.

She became an American citizen in 1949. During the 1970s she supported the referendum against the first nuclear power plant in her homeland: the Zwentendorf Nuclear Power Plant. Her greatest achievement was the opposition ("Coalition for Nuclear Power Postponement") to a nuclear power plant planned by Delmarva Power on the banks of the Chesapeake & Delaware Canal.

In 2006, she warned of the consequences of a nuclear attack on Iran. She also protested against the Patriot Act and took part in demonstrations in Washington D.C.

She died in Wilmington, Delaware. The Indian consultant Arun Shrivastava published an obituary on 15 November 2012.

See also
Ellen Thomas
List of books about nuclear issues
List of nuclear whistleblowers
Nuclear disarmament
Nuclear weapons and the United States
Nevada Test Site
Alvin C. Graves
National Security Archive

References

1922 births
2012 deaths
People from Waidhofen an der Ybbs
Austrian emigrants to the United States
People with acquired American citizenship
American anti–nuclear power activists